This is a list of all German women's football champions. TuS Wörrstadt won the first championship, held in 1974. SSG Bergisch Gladbach is the club with the most championships, winning the trophy nine times. The women's football department of the club has since moved to Bayer Leverkusen.

West German champions (1973–1997)
The German women's football championship was first held in 1973–74. Until 1989–90 the German championship was held as a single-elimination tournament. A nationwide league, the Bundesliga was incepted in 1990–91. As the league consisted of two divisions playoffs were still held at the end of the season. In 1991–92 one club from former East Germany was admitted to each division of the Bundesliga, both were relegated at the end of the season, though.

Key

Single division Bundesliga (1997–present)
In 1997–98 the two Bundesliga divisions were merged into a uniform league of twelve teams.

Key

East German champions

Turbine Potsdam won six championships in the East Germany, making them the team with the most titles. The only other team to win more than one championship were the 1987 and 1988 title holders Rotation Schlema.

Championships won by club
Thirteen different club have won at least one women's football championship. SSG Bergisch Gladbach won the most titles with nine championships. In addition to their six all-German championships Turbine Potsdam has won six East German championships. Tennis Borussia Berlin finished second three times, making them the club that came in most often second without ever winning a championship.

Titles by region

See also

 German football champions
 Women's Bundesliga

References

 

Champions
Germany
Champions
German

de:Liste der Deutschen Fußballmeister